The 1987 NCAA Division I women's volleyball tournament began with 32 teams and ended on December 19, 1987, when Hawaii defeated Stanford 3 games to 1 in the NCAA championship match.

Hawaii won the school's third NCAA national title and fourth overall in women's volleyball, while Stanford finished as runners-up for the third time in four years. Hawaii  was led by AVCA National Player of the Year Teee Williams' 17 kills.

Brackets

Northwest regional

Mideast regional

South regional

West regional

Final Four - Market Square Arena, Indianapolis, Indiana

See also
NCAA Women's Volleyball Championship

References

NCAA Women's Volleyball Championship
NCAA Division I Women's
NCAA
NCAA Division I women's volleyball tournament
NCAA Division I women's volleyball tournament
Volleyball in Indiana